"Always Breaking My Heart" is the second single from American singer Belinda Carlisle's sixth studio album, A Woman and a Man (1996). The song was written by Per Gessle from Swedish band Roxette, and a demo of the song recorded by Gessle was later released as a B-side of his single "Do You Wanna Be My Baby?", as well as the 2009 reissue of Crash! Boom! Bang! (1994). Released on September 9, 1996, "Always Breaking My Heart" peaked at number eight on the UK Singles Chart and number 50 in Australia. It remains Carlisle's final UK top-10 hit.

Critical reception
British magazine Music Week rated the song three out of five, writing, "Distinctively Belinda Carlisle, this hook-laden tune by Roxette's Per Gessle will se her straight back on the airwaves and high in the chart again."

Music video

The accompanying music video for "Always Breaking My Heart" was directed by Philippe Gautier.

Track listings
UK CD1
 "Always Breaking My Heart" (single version)
 "Love Walks In"
 "The Ballad of Lucy Jordan"

UK CD2 and Australian CD single
 "Always Breaking My Heart" (single version)
 "Heaven Is a Place on Earth"
 "Circle in the Sand"
 "I Get Weak"

UK cassette single and European CD single
 "Always Breaking My Heart" (single version)
 "Heaven Is a Place on Earth"

Charts

References

External links
 Belinda Carlisle 1996 singles at BelindaVault

1996 singles
1996 songs
Belinda Carlisle songs
Chrysalis Records singles
Per Gessle songs
Roxette songs
Songs written by Per Gessle